Tyler Shawn Brownsword (born 31 December 1999) is an English professional footballer who plays as a midfielder for League One club Morecambe.

Career
Brownsword came through the Morecambe youth-team to make his debut in the English Football League on 23 March 2019, coming on as a 71st-minute substitute for Sam Lavelle in a 4–0 defeat at Swindon Town.

Statistics

References

1999 births
Living people
Footballers from Newcastle upon Tyne
English footballers
Association football midfielders
Morecambe F.C. players
English Football League players